John Crouch may refer to:
John Crouch (cricketer) (1793–1858), English cricketer
John Crouch (jockey) (1915–1939), British jockey
John Crouch (racing driver) in Australian Grand Prix
John Crouch (MP) for Cricklade

See also
Jack Crouch (disambiguation)